Major-General Harold Whitla Higginson  (10 November 1873 – 30 October 1954) was a British Army officer.

Military career
Born the son of Colonel Theophilus Higginson and educated at St Lawrence College, Ramsgate and the Royal Military College, Sandhurst, Higginson was commissioned into the Royal Dublin Fusiliers in 1894. After seeing action in the Second Boer War, he became commanding officer of the 2nd Battalion, Royal Dublin Fusiliers on the Western Front in June 1915 during the First world War and was appointed a Companion of the Distinguished Service Order on 14 January 1916. He became commander of 53rd Brigade on 2 May 1916 and saw action during the Battle of the Somme in autumn 1916 and the Battle of Passchendaele in autumn 1917. He became General Officer Commanding 12th (Eastern) Division in April 1918 and, after commanding his division at the Battle of Amiens in August 1918, was awarded a bar to his DSO on 18 September 1918. He continued to command his division during the Hundred Days Offensive in autumn 1918 and was appointed a Companion of the Order of the Bath in the 1919 New Year Honours.

After the war, he became commander of 17th Infantry Brigade at Cork in Ireland in November 1919: this was a troubled time in the city leading up to the Burning of Cork by the Black and Tans in December 1920. His last appointments were as commander of 2nd Infantry Brigade at Aldershot in February 1922, Officer Commanding the British Troops in Ceylon in 1924 and General Officer Commanding 55th (West Lancashire) Infantry Division in September 1928 before retiring in September 1932.

References

1873 births
1954 deaths
Military personnel of British India
British Army major generals
Companions of the Order of the Bath
Companions of the Distinguished Service Order
Royal Dublin Fusiliers officers
British military personnel of the Irish War of Independence
British Army personnel of the Second Boer War
British Army generals of World War I
Graduates of the Royal Military College, Sandhurst
People educated at St Lawrence College, Ramsgate
General Officers Commanding, Ceylon
Official members of the Legislative Council of Ceylon